Navaneetam (pronounced navanītam, meaning the eternal new one) is a rāgam in Carnatic music (musical scale of South Indian classical music). It is the 40th Melakarta rāgam (parent scale) in the 72 melakarta rāgam system of Carnatic music. It is called  in Muthuswami Dikshitar school of Carnatic music.
Navaneetham is a Sanskrit word meaning fresh butter. 'Nava' meaning fresh (new) and 'neetham' meaning butter.

Structure and Lakshana

It is the 4th rāgam in the 7th chakra Rishi. The mnemonic name is Rishi-Bhu. The mnemonic phrase is sa ra ga mi pa dhi ni. Its  structure (ascending and descending scale) is as follows (see swaras in Carnatic music for details on below notation and terms):
: 
: 
(this scale uses the notes shuddha rishabham, shuddha gandharam, prati madhyamam, chatushruti dhaivatam, kaisiki nishadam)

As it is a melakarta rāgam, by definition it is a sampūrṇa rāgam (has all seven notes in ascending and descending scale). It is the prati madhyamam equivalent of Vanaspati, which is the 4th melakarta rāgam.

Janya rāgams 
Navanītam does not yet have a janya rāgam (derived scale) associated with it. See List of janya rāgams for full list of janya scales.

Compositions
A few compositions set to Navaneetam scale are:

Umāpati pāhi by Dr. M. Balamuralikrishna in Telugu
Lēmidelpa peddavāru by Thyagaraja in Telugu
Sami ide nalla samayam by Koteeswara Iyer
Himātmajē Santatam Pāhimām by Dr. M. Balamuralikrishna in Sanskrit

Related rāgams
This section covers the theoretical and scientific aspect of this rāgam.

Navaneetam's notes when shifted using Graha bhedam, yields no other melakarta rāgam, like all 6 rāgams in the Rishi chakra (Salagam, Jalarnavam, Jhalavarali, Pavani and Raghupriya being the other 5). Only these rāgams have a gap of 3 notes anywhere in their scale, between G1 to M2. Such a gap does not occur in any other melakarta by definition. Graha bhedam is the step taken in keeping the relative note frequencies same, while shifting the shadjam to the next note in the rāgam.

Notes

References

Melakarta ragas